Walter Hilliard Bidwell (June 21, 1798 – September 11, 1881) was an American magazine editor.

Bidwell, son of William and Mary (née Pelton) Bidwell, was born in Farmington, Connecticut, June 21, 1798.  He joined the Sophomore Class of Yale College in 1824 and graduated in 1827.   The two years after graduation were employed in extinguishing the debts incurred by his college course; in 1829 he entered the Yale Divinity School, and was licensed to preach in the spring of 1833. He had previously married Susan M. Duryea, of New York, and on account of her feeble health spent with her a year in England and France. On September 19, 1833, he was ordained pastor of the Congregational Church in Medfield, Mass, but on the failure of his voice, after a pastorate of four years, removed to the milder climate of Philadelphia.

In the beginning of 1841 he began editorial life as the conductor of the American National Preacher, which—with the omission of some years—he continued to edit until 1867, 19 years in all.  In April 1843, he became the proprietor and nominal editor of the New York Evangelist; he retained this connection for nearly twelve years, when he was obliged to relinquish it on the temporary failure of his health In the meantime (1846) he became the proprietor and conductor of the American Biblical Repository, and also of the Eclectic Magazine of Foreign Literature; the former periodical passed out of his hands in 1849, but the latter he conducted in person until 1868. In the autumn of 1860 he became the proprietor and publisher of the American Theological Review, which, was merged in another review two years later. During the years of his business life he went to Europe six times, partly on account of his health, and partly in the interest of the Eclectic Magazine.

After retiring from active employment, he removed to Oberlin, Ohio, being attracted by the earnest religious life which he found there. Much of the last year of his life was spent in Chicago; a few weeks before his death he went to Saratoga Springs, where he died, suddenly, September 11, 1881, in the 84th year of his age.

External links
 

1798 births
1881 deaths
People from Farmington, Connecticut
Yale Divinity School alumni
American magazine editors
American Congregationalist ministers
Yale College alumni
19th-century American clergy